S. A. Khaleque is a Bangladesh Nationalist Party politician and the former Member of Parliament of Dhaka-11.

Political life 
Khaleque is a member of the BNP executive committee. He has served as the Deputy Mayor of Undivided Dhaka City Corporation.

He was elected a Member of Parliament for the first time from the then Dhaka-14 constituency in the second general election held on 18 February 1979 on the nomination of the BNP.

He was elected Member of Parliament from Dhaka-11 constituency on the nomination of Jatiya Party in the 3rd Jatiya Sangsad elections held on 7 May 1986 and in the 4th Jatiya Sangsad elections held on 3 March 1988.

Prior to the Sixth National Election on 15 February 1996, he rejoined the BNP and was elected Member of Parliament. He was elected as a Member of Parliament from Dhaka-11 constituency in the 8th Jatiya Sangsad elections in 2001 as a candidate in the Bangladesh Nationalist Party.

He was defeated in the ninth parliamentary election of 2008 by participating in the nomination of BNP from Dhaka-14 constituency.

References

Living people
Year of birth missing (living people)
People from Dhaka District
Bangladesh Nationalist Party politicians
2nd Jatiya Sangsad members
3rd Jatiya Sangsad members
4th Jatiya Sangsad members
6th Jatiya Sangsad members
8th Jatiya Sangsad members